José María Rodríguez Vaquero (born 5 January 1980), commonly known as Chema Rodríguez, is a Spanish handball coach and former player.

Honours
Benfica
EHF European League: 2021–22

References

1980 births
Living people
Spanish male handball players
People from Palencia
Sportspeople from the Province of Palencia
S.L. Benfica handball managers